Thangmi, also called Thāmī, Thangmi Kham, Thangmi Wakhe, and Thani, is a Sino-Tibetan language spoken in central-eastern Nepal and northeastern India by the Thami people. The Thami refer to their language as Thangmi Kham or Thangmi Wakhe while the rest of Nepal refers to it as Thāmī. The majority of these speakers, however, live in Nepal in their traditional homeland of Dolakhā District. In India, the Thami population is concentrated mostly in Darjeeling. The Thangmi language is written using the Devanagari script.  Thangmi has been extensively documented by Mark Turin.

Distribution
Thangmi is spoken in Bagmati Province, mainly in the region of Dolakha; villages on Sailung Khola (The northern panhandle of the Ramechhap District; mainly in Gokulganga); eastern regions of Sindhupalchowk District; and by some elders among the population who migrated to the cities in the Kathmandu Valley.

Very few ethnic Thami outside Dolakha and Sindhupalcok districts speak Thangmi.

Classification 
The Thangmi language seems to have many similarities with other languages in Nepal. For example, Barām, Kiranti and Newar. Studies from Konow (1909), Shafer (1966), Stein (1970), Toba (1990), van Driem (1992) and Turin demonstrate that Thangmi is closely related to the Rai and Newar languages.

Grammar

Dialects

Dolakhā vs. Sindhupālchok 

Thangmi consists of two dialects, Dolakhā (East) and Sindhupālchok (West). They differ in terms of phonology, nominal, and verbal morphology and in lexicon. The majority of the Thangmi speaking population use the Dolakhā dialect while only a handful speak in Sindhupālcok. The Dolakhā dialect offers a more complete verbal agreement system while the Sindhupālcok dialect has a more complex nominal morphology.

Thangmi songs 
The Thami population are people who are rich in cultural and traditions. Their language is a large part of who they are and they portray this in their cultural, mostly in music. The Nepal Tham Society (NTS) produced a handful of Thangmi songs that were recorded in 2007. The lyrics were written by Singh Bahadur Thami, Devendra Thami and Lok Bahadur Thami. Here are some examples:

Comparative vocabulary
The following 210-word list of five Thami dialects is from Regmi, et al. (2014). The dialects covered are:
Babre VDC, Dolakha District
Lapilang VDC, Dolakha District
Suspa Kshamavati VDC, Dolakha District
Daduwa VDC, Ramechhap District
Chokati VDC, Sindhupalchok District

Baram words from Kansakar (2010) are also provided for comparison.

References

Further reading 
. 2012.

 Saxena, A. (Ed.). (2004). Himalayan languages: past and present (Vol. 149). Walter de Gruyter.
 

Shneiderman, S. B. (2009). Rituals of ethnicity: Migration, mixture, and the making of Thangmi identity across Himalayan borders (Doctoral dissertation, Cornell University).
Sara, S. (2015). Epilogue: Thami ke ho?What Is Thami?. In, Rituals of Ethnicity : Thangmi Identities Between Nepal and India (p. 252). Philadelphia: University of Pennsylvania Press.
Sara, S. (2015). 3. Origin Myths and Myths of Originality. In, Rituals of Ethnicity : Thangmi Identities Between Nepal and India (p. 61). Philadelphia: University of Pennsylvania Press.
Grierson, G. A. (1909). Tibeto-Burman Family: General Introduction, Specimens of the Tibetan Dialects, the Himalayan Dialects, and the North Assam group. (Linguistic Survey of India, III(I).) Calcutta: Office of the Superintendent of Government Printing. 669pp.
Shneiderman, S. (2010). ‘Producing’ Thangmi Ritual Texts: Practice, performance and collaboration. In Imogen Gunn and Mark Turin (eds.) Language Documentation and Description, Vol 8, 159-174 London: SOAS. 
Turin, M. (2011). Languages of the Greater Himalayan Region, Volume 6: A Grammar of the Thangmi Language (2 vols): With an Ethnolinguistic Introduction to the Speakers and Their Culture. Brill.

External links 
OLAC resources in and about the Thangmi language
 http://www.digitalhimalaya.com/collections/music/rengpatangko/
http://www.endangeredlanguages.com/lang/4838

Articles in class projects/Rutgers
Mahakiranti languages
Languages of Nepal
Languages of India
Languages of Bagmati Province